Mahboula is a Kuwaiti district on the Persian Gulf,  south of Kuwait City.  It is located in the Ahmadi Governorate between Fintās and Abu Halifa. 

In the mid-2000s, Mahboula was essentially "uninhabited, with a few old buildings and unsafe streets."  In 2013, the Kuwait Oil Company announced plans to expand their business, and this led to an explosion of residential development of adjacent areas—including Mahboula.  By 2016, tens of apartment buildings had sprouted, though the construction quality, environmental impacts, and infrastructure demands thereof were questioned by the Kuwait Times.  That newspaper also reported that renting  apartments cost 170– (equivalent to – United States dollars in ).

In February 2019, a residential building caught fire, injuring 23 people and stranding over 100 on the floors above the extinguished fire.

References

districts of Al Ahmadi Governorate